102 (one hundred [and] two) is the natural number following 101 and preceding 103.

In mathematics
102 is an abundant number and a semiperfect number. It is a sphenic number.

The sum of Euler's totient function φ(x) over the first eighteen integers is 102.

102 is the first three-digit base 10 polydivisible number, since 1 is divisible by 1, 10 is divisible by 2 and 102 is divisible by 3. This also shows that 102 is a Harshad number. 102 is the first 3-digit number divisible by the numbers 3, 6, 17, 34 and 51.

10264 + 1 is a prime number

There are 102 vertices in the Biggs-Smith graph.

In science
The atomic number of nobelium, an actinide.

In other fields

102 is also:

 The emergency telephone number for police in Ukraine and Belarus
 The emergency telephone number for fire in Israel
 The emergency telephone number for ambulance in parts of India
 The emergency telephone number for ambulance in Maldives

See also
 List of highways numbered 102
 One Hundred and Two, a song by The Judds

References

 Wells, D. The Penguin Dictionary of Curious and Interesting Numbers London: Penguin Group. (1987): 133

Integers